The canton of Sains-Richaumont is a former administrative division in northern France. It was disbanded following the French canton reorganisation which came into effect in March 2015. It consisted of 19 communes, which joined the canton of Marle in 2015. It had 4,450 inhabitants (2012).

The canton comprised the following communes:

Berlancourt
Chevennes
Colonfay
Franqueville
Le Hérie-la-Viéville
Housset
Landifay-et-Bertaignemont
Lemé
Marfontaine
Monceau-le-Neuf-et-Faucouzy
La Neuville-Housset
Puisieux-et-Clanlieu
Rougeries
Sains-Richaumont
Saint-Gobert
Saint-Pierre-lès-Franqueville
Le Sourd
Voharies
Wiège-Faty

Demographics

See also
Cantons of the Aisne department

References

Former cantons of Aisne
2015 disestablishments in France
States and territories disestablished in 2015